Karakoyun may refer to:
Kara Koyunlu, a Turkic tribal federation
Karakoyunlu, a district of Iğdır Province in Turkey
Karakoyun, Armenia, a town in Armenia